Isaac Adu Mensah (born February 18, 1988), professionally known as Yaw Skyface, is a Ghanaian filmmaker, director and cinematographer. His debut film Door 2 Door was met with mostly positive reviews upon its release in 2017.

Early life
Yaw was born in (Kwahu  Abetifi, Eastern Region). He spent part of his childhood growing up in Takoradi, until his family moved to Accra. After graduating from Takoradi Polytechnic in 2008, he began working as a video director in 2009.

Film directions

Filmography
 Door 2 Door (2017)

Music videos

References

Ghanaian music video directors
Ghanaian film directors
1989 births
Takoradi Technical University alumni
Living people